Wabun is an unincorporated community in western Roanoke County, Virginia, United States.  The community lies along the Roanoke River and near the base of Poor Mountain.

References

Unincorporated communities in Roanoke County, Virginia
Unincorporated communities in Virginia